Radda may refer to:

 Radha Cuadrado, a Filipino singer and songwriter
 George Radda, a Hungarian chemist
 Radda District, a district of the Al Bayda Governorate, Yemen
 Radda in Chianti, municipality  in the Province of Siena in the Italian region Tuscany

See also 

 Rada (disambiguation)